Mannersdorf an der Rabnitz is a municipality in the district of Oberpullendorf in the Austrian state of Burgenland.

Geography
The municipality includes the following settlements:
 Klostermarienberg
 Unterloisdorf
 Mannersdorf
 Rattersdorf
 Liebing

Population

References

Cities and towns in Oberpullendorf District